The Jägergewehr 1856/59, originally designed in 1853, was intended to be a service rifle for use by the Swiss armed forces. It was one of the first pure infantry weapons to feature a rifled barrel. However, by the time all 14,000 procured weapons were delivered in 1860, they were already perceived as obsolete and were never issued to the troops.

References
 

Rifles of Switzerland
Early rifles
Muzzleloaders
Hinged breechblock rifles